Ahmet Nuri Öztekin (1876; Bandırma - ?; ?) was an officer of the Ottoman Army and the Turkish Army.

Medals and decorations
Medal of Independence with Red Ribbon

See also
List of high-ranking commanders of the Turkish War of Independence
Mustafa Suphi

Sources

1876 births
People from Bandırma
People from Hüdavendigâr vilayet
Turkish people of Circassian descent
Ottoman Military Academy alumni
Ottoman Military College alumni
Ottoman Army officers
Ottoman military personnel of the Italo-Turkish War
Ottoman military personnel of the Balkan Wars
Ottoman military personnel of World War I
Ottoman prisoners of war
World War I prisoners of war held by Russia
Turkish Army officers
Turkish military personnel of the Turkish War of Independence
Turkish military personnel of the Greco-Turkish War (1919–1922)
Burials at Turkish State Cemetery
Recipients of the Medal of Independence with Red Ribbon (Turkey)
Year of death missing